Michel François-Jacques Kerguélen (1928–1999) was a French botanist.
He was the author or co-author of over 250 plant taxa.

References

External links
l'Index Synonymique de la Flore de France (in French)

1928 births
1999 deaths
20th-century French botanists